Kanzul Iman (Urdu and Arabic: کنزالایمان)  meaning as 'Treasure of Faith ' is an Urdu paraphrase translation of the Qur'an by Ahmad Raza Khan produced in 1911. It is one of the translations of the Qur'an in Urdu language.

Translations

Ala Hazrat Imam Ahmad Raza Khan wrote the translation in Urdu. It has been subsequently translated into other European and South Asian languages including English, Hindi, Bengali, Dutch, Turkish, Sindhi, Gujarati and Pashto.

In English

 The Holy Qur'án (The treasure of faith) Kanzul Iman (urdu), Rendered into English, Professor Shah Faridul Haque. 
Other translation was completed by Professor Hanif Akhtar Fatmi. Aqib Farid Qadri recently published a third translation.

In Dutch
 De Heilige Qoraan, Rendered into Dutch by Goelam Rasoel Alladien 

In Turkish
 Kur'an-i Karîm, Rendered into Turkish by İsmail Hakkı İzmirli

Prominent institutions 
A library with the name Kanzul Iman Islamic Library was established in Bareilly in the year 2006.

See also
List of translations of the Qur'an
Qur'an translations

References

External links 
Online Quran Project includes the Qur'an translation by Kanzul Iman (Farid ul Haque).
'' 
Al Quran Kanzul Eman at Alahazrat.net
Al Quran Kanzul Eman (Noorul Irfan & Khazain ul Irfan) at Rehmani.net
Urdu Transaltion of Quran from Kanzul Iman with Tafseer
English Translation of Quran from Kanzul Iman with Tafseer
Kanzuliman Islamic Library, Bareilly (Uttar Pradesh), India

Quran translations
Urdu-language books
Barelvi literature
1911 books
1911 in India
Works of Ahmed Raza Khan Barelvi
20th-century Indian books
Indian non-fiction books
Indian religious texts
Islamic literature
Sunni literature